The Rans S-6 Coyote II is an American single-engined, tractor configuration, two-seat, high-wing monoplane designed by Randy Schlitter and manufactured by Rans Inc. The Coyote is available in kit form for amateur construction or as a completed light-sport aircraft.

Design and development
The original single seat S-4 Coyote was designed by Rans owner Randy Schlitter in 1982, as a result of his dissatisfaction with existing ultralight designs at the time. Construction of the first Coyote prototype was started in November 1982, with the first flight following in March 1983.

The Coyote II two-seater was developed from the S-5 Coyote, itself a development of the S-4 Coyote. The initial two seat model, the S-6, was replaced by the improved S-6ES ("extended span") model in April 1990. In 1993, the ES was joined in production by the S-6S Super Coyote.

All models of the S-6 feature a welded 4130 steel tube cockpit, with a bolted aluminum tube rear fuselage, wing and tail surfaces all covered in fabric. In the initial S-6 and S-6ES, the fabric consists of pre-sewn Dacron envelopes, which shorten construction time. The S-6S, however, uses the more traditional dope and fabric. The reported construction times for the ES are 250 man-hours versus 500 for the Super.

The Coyote II kit can be ordered with tricycle or conventional landing gear, and can also be equipped with floats and skis. Today, the standard engine is the  Rotax 912UL, with the  Rotax 912ULS being optional. The aircraft can also be fitted with the Sauer S 2200 UL

Operational history
The Coyote has proven to be popular with customers, with over 1800 examples of the type having flown as of January 2008.   In November 2010 615 were on the registers of European countries west of Russia, excluding Ireland.

One example of the S-6ES was flown across the Atlantic Ocean twice.

Variants

S-6
Initial version, standard engine  Rotax 503. No longer in production.
S-6ES
Improved version with "extended span" wings introduced in April 1990. Standard engine is the  Rotax 912ULS. Available with standard wing, "116" wing and "light sport wing". In production in 2012.
S-6LS
Factory built light-sport aircraft version of the Coyote II. Standard engine is the  Rotax 912ULS and the 2010 base price is US$99,000.
S-6S Super Six
Improved version with dope and fabric covering, introduced in 1993. Standard engine is the  Rotax 912ULS. Available with standard wing, "116" wing and "light sport wing". In production in 2010.

Specifications (S-6ES)

See also

References

External links

1980s United States civil utility aircraft
Homebuilt aircraft
Light-sport aircraft
S-006 Coyote II
High-wing aircraft
Single-engined tractor aircraft
Aircraft first flown in 1988